Ellingham Hall may refer to:

 Ellingham Hall, Norfolk
 Ellingham Hall, Northumberland 

Architectural disambiguation pages